Cry, the Beloved Country is a 1948 novel by Alan Paton.

Cry, the Beloved Country may also refer to:

Cry, the Beloved Country (1951 film)
Cry, the Beloved Country (1995 film)

See also
Lost in the Stars (film), a 1974 Kurt Weill-Maxwell Anderson musical adaptation of Alan Paton's novel